Todd Ollivier (born 7 July 1979) is a former Australian professional dual-code rugby player. He was the Sydney Club Competition Rookie of the Year in 2000, playing for the Eastern Suburbs Rugby Union Football Club. He earned seven caps for the New South Wales Waratahs, before switching codes and making one appearance in 2003 for the Sydney Roosters of the National Rugby League (NRL). Shortly after, he returned to rugby union, playing for French Top 16 side Béziers (2004–05) and Italian Super 10 sides Petrarca Rugby (2006–07) and Rugby Roma Olimpic (2008–10).

References

1979 births
Living people
Australian expatriate rugby union players
Rugby Roma Olimpic players
Sydney Roosters players